Naval Special Forces Command, also called the  ("Combat Swimmers", abbreviated "KSM") or  (Deployment Group 3402) are an elite special forces unit of the Germany Navy, specializing in commando and amphibious warfare operations. They are the only special-purpose force of the German Navy. The Kampfschwimmer were set up when Germany joined NATO in 1955.

During the existence of the GDR (East Germany), the People's Navy (Volksmarine) of the GDR also had a commando frogman force, the Kampfschwimmerkommando 18, which was stationed in Kühlungsborn. They trained at Prora on Rügen.

History
The first German frogman commando unit was formed under the direction of Alfred von Wurzian during World War II, an Olympic swimmer originally from Austria. Wurzian was initially an artilleryman. He had to overcome a lot of hurdles to form this specialized unit as many brass types could not buy into the concept of such a specialized unit. The unit's name was Küstenjäger-Abteilung "Brandenburg".

1942 – 1943
1942 onwards: Amateur diver Alfred von Wurzian tested breathing apparatus (Dräger oxygen rebreathers from Hans Hass) for the Kriegsmarine.
1942: German frogmen clashed with Soviet frogmen at a Tsemes Bay seaport at Novorossiysk. The skirmish resulted in some knife battles underwater.
1943: Admiral Karl Dönitz orders Vice-Admiral Hellmuth Heye to create a special unit. Its first men, including von Wurzian, were trained by experienced Italian Decima Flottiglia MAS men. (The German Waffen-SS also had a frogman section called .)

1944
1944 June: Three German frogman units called "" (MEK) became active. Each unit had one officer and 22 men. But they were not ready for D-Day.
1944 June 23: German naval frogmen blow up two bridges on the Orne river, using two torpedoes of 800 kg.
1944 July: There were several attacks by German Neger craft in the English Channel, setting off from Villers sur Mer. On July 8, these attacks badly damaged the cruiser ORP Dragon (which was scuttled on July 20), and sunk the destroyer HMS Isis. 12 attack boats were used in attacks in the mouth of the Orne river.
July 1944: German frogmen destroyed the lock gates on the Orne river.
26 August 1944: MEK 60 German frogmen destroyed the Vascouy coastal artillery battery position.
1944 September 16: By this time the Allies had taken Antwerp. Two teams of five German frogmen left Rotterdam on two attack boats, to attack Antwerp docks. When they were stopped by defence nets, the teams continued by swimming, each towing a torpedo with a ton of explosive. One team placed its torpedo on the main canal lock in Antwerp. The lock was out of use for three months.
1944, night of September 28–29: By now the Allies had taken intact a road bridge at Nijmegen and a railway bridge at Moerdijk, and had immediately installed a strong anti-aircraft defence there. In order to assist with a German counter offensive against the Nijmegen salient, three groups of four German frogmen set off from 10 km upstream from the bridges. They were to place explosives under the bridges and then to continue with the river current 24 km further to return to their lines. The railway bridge was blown up. The road bridge was only slightly damaged because the mine had been badly placed. Of the 12 men, three were killed, seven were captured, and two returned to their lines.
Soviet EPRON Diver K.D. Zolotovskiy claims his Soviet frogman team had underwater skirmishes with German frogmen in the Svir river.
1944 December: German frogman operations in the Vistula river.
After Italy changed sides, the German frogman unit MEK71 based in Jugoslavia made numerous attacks against liberated Italy, using two-man canoes.

1945
February 1945: German frogmen operations in the Oder river.
March 1945: Multiple failed attempts to destroy the Ludendorff Bridge near Remagen by German frogmen. The final failed attempt was performed by seven German Waffen SS frogmen.
March–April 1945:German frogmen destroyed two important supply bridges in Stettin harbor. Three bridges were destroyed between the island of Wollin and the Pomeranian mainland. Another bridge was destroyed by German frogmen near Dievenow.
May 1945 German frogmen failed in their initial attempt to blow up the pontoon bridges at Nipperwiese and Fiddichow. 
May 1945 German frogmen succeed in their second attempt to blow up the pontoon bridges at Nipperwiese and Fiddichow. Frogmen Siegfried Koneke and Walter Lewandowski were awarded the German Cross in Gold for their actions.

Craft developed by Germany during World War II
The "lentil". It is a fast silent boat carrying 300 kg of explosive. The pilot directs it and then jumps in the sea and is collected by another boat.
A "chariot" copied from that of the British who copied it from the Italian maiale. The Italians never transmitted to the Germans the plans of their maiale.
The "Neger" (German for "negro"), a single-seat torpedo sailing awash at four knots. Its pilot leaves it before precipitating it on the objective.
Creation of pocket submarines (one-seater and two-seater).

Incompletely planned operations
 Plan to attack the underwater oil pipeline PLUTO.
 Plan to block the Suez Canal by sinking boats in it.

Post World War II
 This section was translated from :de:Kampfschwimmer (Bundeswehr); refer back there in case of query about the translation.

The Kampfschwimmer were set up particularly because Germany joined NATO and there was felt to be risk of war with the Soviet Union. A unit was needed which could help to secure the Baltic Sea exits through the Danish Straits. On 1 August 1958 Group 3402, as these commando frogmen were called by the navy, was set up. It consisted of men without a Nazi past, who had served in World War II in the small combat forces and the naval employment commands.

The first Kampfschwimmer were trained first with the Nageurs de combat in France. France had developed the role of the commando frogmen further in the Indochina war, to the modern single fighter.

The Kampfschwimmer should carry out their tasks both in the water and ashore, like German commando frogmen did in World War II. But now a new dimension was added: airborne operations. This three-role concept of the French became the basis of the commando frogmen of the German navy.

On 1 April 1964, the Kampfschwimmer appeared for the first time as an independent body. In the following years they extended their tasks, but lacked money. Thus e.g. they had to buy their own drysuit undersuits.

Roles

In the Gulf War, German frogmen completed various operations that are classified by German Intelligence and such. Frogmen have decreased ten times in size as in the 1990s they had est. 3,500-4,000 troops.

The naval commandos were also active from 1994 to 1996, during the NATO arms embargo against former Yugoslavia. The frogmen conducted boarding operations of suspicious freighters from German frigates and destroyers. Due to insufficient berthing capabilities on board the German warships, the boarding parties were usually undermanned. The commandos had to train ordinary crewmembers as auxiliaries in tasks such as keeping watch and taking control of the engine room and bridge of the boarded vessels.

Organization
Since 1974 the Kampfschwimmer have been stationed in the naval base at Eckernförde near Kiel. In October 1994 they were subordinate to the Flotilla of Mine Warfare. In Eckernförde a combat frogman group was set up, it consists of a mine clearance diver company and a commando frogmen company. Allegedly the weapon diver group has 250 men. The commando frogmen company had, according to strength and equipment records, 3 groups, each with 16 men. Of it, approximately 40 men are actively operational.

In 2001 the Waffentauchergruppe ("Armed Diver Group") became the Bataillon Spezialisierter Kräfte ("Specialised Forces Battalion").

By a transformation in 2003 the :de:Spezialisierte Einsatzkräfte Marine ("Specialised Task Forces of the Navy") was formed. The SEK M was divided further into the Combat Swimmer Company, a mine clearance diver company, and two naval companies for special employments (e.g. to board ships), a training inspection group, and further support elements.

Conditions for entry
Success rate is approximately 30% which is up from the previous 5-10 percent over the three-year training period.
These minimum requirements must be fulfilled by all candidates, to become certified for training:
 They must be at least 17 years old and no more than 25 years old.
 Realschulabschluss or Abitur, with favorable exam passes.
 1000m swim in less than 24 minutes
 5000m run in less than 22 minutes
 30m distance swim underwater without equipment
 Stay underwater without breathing for at least 60 seconds
 Sport test with at least 20 points; at least 3 points for each exercise
 Active duty soldier must have at least attained the rank of Feldwebel or be officer. The civilian applicant must be ready to enlist for 12 years.
 Parachute jump fitness is examined by the same institute.

Training
During the training, it is less about the physical load than the psychological load, which causes many applicants to give up. The physical achievement can be trained, but overcoming the fear is the most important goal of the training. The training includes but is not limited to swimming, diving, navigation, close combat, weapons handling, and parachuting. In the special conclusion exercise their ability and hardness are equally demanded, before they join the circle of the commando frogmen. In further training sections they are trained as team leaders or specialists.

Introductory training
First there are four weeks of introductory training. In this time the applicants are pushed hard physically and psychologically by fixed exercises. All exercises have the goal to take away the fear of water and to make the applicant feel safe in the water. One of the exercises is called  (the bound swimming). The applicant is placed on the starting block in the full combat suit, with his hands tied behind his back and his feet tied together, and then pushed in the swimming pool. He must stay for 30 seconds alone clearly; afterwards a safety diver pulls him back up.

In the so-called "hate week" the trainees are deprived of sleep. Between the night exercises, there are night runs. Meanwhile, the normal routine of the day continues: swimming, diving, and push-ups.

They also have to train to exit and enter a submarine through a torpedo tube. At the final examination they have to swim about 30 km with full equipment in the Baltic Sea to reach the beach after being discharged at the sea.

Equipment

Weapons
 
Eickhorn S.E.K. Marine knife (designed specifically for this unit)

Eickhorn knives, Various models

Vehicles

Special equipment

Gear

 3M 
 Peltor Comtac XPI Dual Com NATO
 Arc'teryx 
 Fire-resistant Combat-clothing
 All-weather clothing
 Bagpacks
 ArmorSource 
 AS-600 helmet (rifle-resistant)
 Carinthia 
 Military sleeping-bags
 Crye Precision 
 Fire-resistant Combat-clothing
 Plate-carriers
 Kinetic support-systems
 Bagpacks
 Pouches
 Belts
 Dräger 
 Rebreather (combat-diving)
 FirstSpear 
 Plate-carriers (Combat-diving)
 Flotation-systems
 Bagpacks
 Pouches
 Belts
 Harris 
 Falcon III RF-7850M-HH
 Combat-electronics
 Heinrichs Weikamp 
 OSTC 4
 Diving-electronics
 JFD 
 Divex Stealth CDLSE
 Divex Dual Mode Mask
 Divex Low Magnetic Fins
 L3-Insight 
 GPNVG-18
 AN/PSQ-36 FGS
 Leo Köhler 
 Fire-resistant Combat-clothing
 All-weather clothing
 Plate-carriers
 Bagpacks
 MATBOCK 
 Parachuting-gear
 Bagpacks
 Medic-gear
 Meindl 
 All-weather Combat-boots
 MEN 
 Ammunition
 Nivisys 
 DVS-110
 Rheinmetall 
 Ammunition
 Combat-electronics
 SeaBear 
 HUDC
 Diving-electronics
 TEA 
 H2O U94 PTT
 Sub Assault
 OSK Maritime Kit
 Team Wendy 
 Retention-Kits
 Liner-Kits
 ARC-Rails
 UF PRO 
 Fire-resistant Combat-clothing
 All-weather clothing
 Ursuit 
 Combat-diving dry-suits
 Combat-diving gear
 W+R PRO 
 Combat-gloves

(site under construction)

See also

References

Further reading
 
 
 
Soviet Combat Divers in World War Two by Pavel Borovikov
German Combat Divers in World War Two by Michael Jung

External links
 http://www.sondereinheiten.de/einheiten/kampfschwimmer/ (in German)
 http://www.marine.de Seiten der Marine (in German).
 http://www.minentaucher.net—the German/English spoken Minentaucher website
 http://www.kampfschwimmer.de—the German/English spoken Kampfschwimmer website

Frogman operations
Armed forces diving
Special forces of Germany
Military units and formations of the German Navy
Counterterrorist organizations
Naval special forces units and formations
Special forces of West Germany